Niall Fitzgerald (born 1981) is an Irish Gaelic footballer who played as a midfielder for the Tipperary senior team.

Born in Clonmel, County Tipperary, Fitzgerald first arrived on the inter-county scene at the age of seventeen when he first linked up with the Tipperary minor team before later joining the under-21 side. He joined the senior panel during the 2000 championship. Fitzgerald subsequently became a regular member of the starting fifteen and won one Tommy Murphy Cup medal.

At club level Fitzgerald is a two-time championship medallist with Moyle Rovers

Fitzgerald retired from inter-county football following the conclusion of the 2009 championship.

Honours

Player

Moyle Rovers
Tipperary Senior Football Championship (1): 2000, 2009

Tipperary
Tommy Murphy Cup (1): 2005
McGrath Cup (1): 2003

References

1981 births
Living people
Moyle Rovers Gaelic footballers
Tipperary inter-county Gaelic footballers